Zakea Dolphin Mangoaela (February 1883 in Hohobeng, Cape Colony – 25 October 1963) was a folklorist and writer.

Mangoaela grew up in Lesotho (called Basutoland at the time) and went to the Basutoland Training College.

Works 
 Lithoko tsa Marena a Basotho (The praise poems of the Basotho kings), published 1921
 Har'a libatana le linyamatsane (Among the predators and the prey)
 Co-authored Grammar of the Sesuto language. Bantu studies Vol. III. (Johannesburg: University of Witwatersrand press, 1927).

References

Lesotho writers
Lesotho male writers
South African writers
South African Sotho people
1883 births
1963 deaths
Linguists from South Africa
Lesotho poets
20th-century linguists
Cape Colony people